Almasguda is a village in Rangareddy district Now, this village is under Badangpet Municipality in Telangana India.

References

Villages in Ranga Reddy district